Adesmus paradiana is a species of beetle in the family Cerambycidae. It was described by Galileo and Martins in 2004. It is known from Ecuador.

References

Adesmus
Beetles described in 2004